Michael A. Battle Sr. (born July 28, 1950) is an American diplomat, chaplain, and academic administrator who has served as United States ambassador to Tanzania since February 2023. He previously served as ambassador to the African Union from 2009 to 2013.

Early life and education 
Battle was born in St. Louis in 1950. He earned a Bachelor of Arts degree in religious studies from Trinity College, a Master of Divinity degree from Duke University, and a Doctor of Ministry degree from Howard University.

Career 
From 1976 to 1996, Battle worked as the chaplain of Hampton University. From 1996 to 1998, he was the associate vice president of Virginia State University. From 1998 to 2003, he worked as the vice president of Chicago State University. He also served as a chaplain in the United States Army Reserve for 20 years. In the 1990s, Battle also worked as the vice president of the American Committee on Africa (now Africa Action). From 2003 to 2009, Battle was the seventh president of the Interdenominational Theological Center.

United States ambassador to the African Union
In 2009, Battle was nominated by President Barack Obama to serve as the United States ambassador to the African Union.

United States ambassador to Tanzania
In August 2021, Battle was appointed by President Joe Biden to serve as United States ambassador to Tanzania. On May 24, 2022, hearings were held on his nomination before the Senate Foreign Relations Committee. On June 9, 2022, the committee favorably reported his nomination to the Senate. On December 13, 2022, Battle was confirmed in the Senate by voice vote. He was sworn in on December 21, 2022, and presented his credentials to President Samia Suluhu Hassan on February 27, 2023.

References 

1950 births
Living people
American chaplains
Chicago State University faculty
Duke University alumni
Hampton University people
People from St. Louis
Representatives of the United States to the African Union
Trinity College (Connecticut) alumni
Virginia State University faculty